The 1969–70 New York Nets season was the third season of the franchise in the  ABA.

Roster

Standings

Playoffs
Eastern Division Semifinals vs. Kentucky Colonels

 Nets lose series, 4–3

References

New York Nets season
New Jersey Nets seasons
New York Nets
New York Nets
Sports in Hempstead, New York